Edwin Alan Barlow (24 February 1912 – 27 June 1980) was an English cricketer. He played 36 first-class matches for Oxford University and Lancashire. Barlow also represented Denbighshire in the Minor Counties Championship.

References

1912 births
1980 deaths
Cricketers from Ashton-under-Lyne
English cricketers
Oxford University cricketers
Lancashire cricketers
Denbighshire cricketers
Alumni of Brasenose College, Oxford